The 2020 Big Ten Men's Swimming and Diving Championships was held from February 26–20, 2020 at the Counsilman-Billingsley Aquatics Center in Bloomington, Indiana. It was the 113th annual  Big Ten-sanctioned swimming and diving championship meet.

Team standings
Full results

Swimming results 
Full results

Diving results

Awards
Big Ten Swimmer of the Championship: Bruno Blaskovic, Indiana

Big Ten Diver of the Championships: Ross Todd, Michigan & Lyle Yost, Ohio State

Big Ten Freshman of the Year: Brendan Burns, Michigan

All-Big Ten Teams
The following swimmers were selected to the All Big-Ten Teams:

Big Ten Sportsmanship Award Honorees

References

2021 BIG 10 Men's Swimming and Diving Championships
2021 BIG 10 Men's Swimming and Diving Championships